Sabra harpagula, the scarce hook-tip, is a moth of the family Drepanidae first described by Eugenius Johann Christoph Esper in 1786. It is found from Europe through temperate Asia to Japan.

The wingspan is 25–35 mm. The moth flies from June to August depending on the location.

The larvae feed on Tilia (including Tilia cordata), Quercus, Alnus and Betula species.

Subspecies
Sabra harpagula harpagula (Europe, south-eastern Russia, Manchuria)
Sabra harpagula bitorosa (Watson, 1968) (China: Sichuan, Shaanxi)
Sabra harpagula emarginata (Watson, 1968) (China: Zhejiang, Fujian)
Sabra harpagula euroista Park, 2011 (Korea)
Sabra harpagula olivacea (Inoue, 1958) (Japan)

References

External links

Moths and Butterflies of Europe and North Africa
Lepiforum e.V.

Moths described in 1786
Drepaninae
Drepanid moths of Great Britain
Moths of Japan
Moths of Europe
Taxa named by Eugenius Johann Christoph Esper